Cantor's intersection theorem refers to two closely related theorems in general topology and real analysis, named after Georg Cantor, about intersections of decreasing nested sequences of non-empty compact sets.

Topological statement
Theorem. Let  be a topological space. A decreasing nested sequence of non-empty compact, closed subsets of  has a non-empty intersection. In other words, supposing  is a sequence of non-empty compact, closed subsets of S satisfying

it follows that

Proof. Assume, by way of contradiction, that . For each , let .

Let . Then  because , by the nesting hypothesis for the collection . Consequently, . But then , a contradiction. ∎

Statement for real numbers
The theorem in real analysis draws the same conclusion for closed and bounded subsets of the set of real numbers . It states that a decreasing nested sequence  of non-empty, closed and bounded subsets of  has a non-empty intersection.

This version follows from the general topological statement in light of the Heine–Borel theorem, which states that sets of real numbers are compact if and only if they are closed and bounded. However, it is typically used as a lemma in proving said theorem, and therefore warrants a separate proof.

On the other hand, both the sequence of open bounded sets  and the sequence of unbounded closed sets  have empty intersection. All these sequences are properly nested. 

For example, in the space of rational numbers, the sets

 

are closed and bounded, but their intersection is empty.

Note that this contradicts neither the topological statement, as the sets  are not compact, nor the variant below, as the rational numbers are not complete with respect to the usual metric.

A simple corollary of the theorem is that the Cantor set is nonempty, since it is defined as the intersection of a decreasing nested sequence of sets, each of which is defined as the union of a finite number of closed intervals; hence each of these sets is non-empty, closed, and bounded. In fact, the Cantor set contains uncountably many points.

Theorem. Let  be a sequence of non-empty, closed, and bounded subsets of  satisfying

Then,

Proof. Each nonempty, closed, and bounded subset  admits a minimal element . Since for each , we have 

,
it follows that
,

so  is an increasing sequence contained in the bounded set . The monotone convergence theorem for bounded sequences of real numbers now guarantees the existence of a limit point

Variant in complete metric spaces 
In a complete metric space, the following variant of Cantor's intersection theorem holds.

Theorem.

where  is defined by

Then the intersection of the  contains exactly one point:

Proof (sketch). So it is sufficient to show that it is not empty. Pick an element  for each . Since the metric space is complete this Cauchy sequence converges to some point . This is true for every , and therefore the intersection of the  must contain . ∎

A converse to this theorem is also true: if  is a metric space with the property that the intersection of any nested family of non-empty closed subsets whose diameters tend to zero is non-empty, then  is a complete metric space.

See also 

 Kuratowski's intersection theorem

References 
 
 Jonathan Lewin. An interactive introduction to mathematical analysis. Cambridge University Press. . Section 7.8.

Articles containing proofs
Real analysis
Compactness theorems
Theorems in calculus